"You're a Germ" is a song by English alternative rock band Wolf Alice. It was released on 10 June 2015 as the third single from their debut studio album, My Love Is Cool.

Background and release
Wolf Alice announced "You're a Germ" as My Love Is Cools third single on 10 June 2015. In an interview with Consequence of Sound, bassist Theo Ellis described the song as "the spark to some of our first mosh pits and holds a solid place in our hearts as one of our older songs."

In popular culture
"You're a Germ" is featured in an episode of The Royals.

Track listing
UK 7" single
 You're a Germ
 Baby Ain't Made of China

Personnel
Credits adapted from the liner notes of "You're a Germ".
 Mike Crossey – production, mixing
 Jonathan Gilmore – engineering
 Robin Schmidt – mastering

References

2015 songs
2015 singles
Wolf Alice songs
Dirty Hit singles
Songs written by Ellie Rowsell